Raghunath Anant Mashelkar, also known as Ramesh Mashelkar, (born 1 January 1943) is an Indian Chemical Engineer, born in a village Mashel in Goa and brought up in Maharashtra. He is a former Director General of the Council of Scientific and Industrial Research (CSIR). He was also the President of Indian National Science Academy (2004-2006), President of Institution of Chemical Engineers (2007) as also the President of Global Research Alliance (2007-2018). He was also first Chairperson of Academy of Scientific and Innovative Research (AcSIR). He is a Fellow of the Royal Society, Fellow of the Royal Academy of Engineering (FREng), Foreign associate of US National Academy of Engineering and the US National Academy of Sciences.

Life and work 
Mashelkar studied at University of Bombay's University Department of Chemical Technology (UDCT; now the Institute of Chemical Technology, Mumbai) where he obtained BE degree in chemical engineering in 1966, and PhD degree in 1969. He currently serves as chancellor of the institute.

He served as the director general of Council of Scientific and Industrial Research (CSIR) - a network of thirty-eight laboratories-for over eleven years. Prior to this, he was Director of National Chemical Laboratory (NCL) for six years.

He has been a visiting professor at Harvard University(2007-2012), at University of Delaware (1976, 1988), and at Technical University of Denmark (1982). He has been Sir Louis Matheson Distinguished Professor at Monash University for thirteen years (2007-2019).

He has been on the board of directors of several companies such as Reliance Industries Ltd, Tata Motors, Hindustan Unilever, Thermax, Piramal Group, KPIT Technologies, etc.

He has been a member of External Research Advisory Board of Microsoft (USA), Advisory Board of VTT (Finland), Corporate Innovation Board of Michelin (France), Advisory Board of National Research Foundation (Singapore), among others.

As Director of India's National Chemical Laboratory (NCL) during 1989-1995, Mashelkar gave a new orientation to NCL's research programmes with strong emphasis on globally competitive technologies and international patenting. NCL, which was involved only in import substitution research till then, began licensing its patents to multinational companies.

As Director General of CSIR, Mashelkar led the process of transformation of CSIR. The book 'World Class in India', has ranked CSIR among the top twelve organizations, who have managed the radical change the best in post-liberalised India.

The process of CSIR transformation has been heralded as one of the ten most significant achievements of Indian Science and Technology in the twentieth century, by eminent astrophysicist Prof. Jayant Narlikar, in his book, The Scientific Edge.

Mashelkar campaigned strongly with Indian academics, researchers and corporates for strengthening the IPR ecosystem. Under his leadership, CSIR occupied the first position in WIPO's top fifty PCT filler among all the developing nations in 2002. CSIR progressed in US patent filing to an extent that they reached 40% share of the US patents granted to India in 2002.

Led by Mashelkar, CSIR successfully fought the battle of revocation of the US patent on wound healing properties of turmeric (USP 5,401,5041) claiming that this was India's traditional knowledge and therefore not novel. Mashelkar also chaired the Technical Committee, which successfully challenged the revocation of the US patents on Basmati Rice (USP 5,663,484) by RiceTec Company, Texas, (2001). This opened up new paradigms in the protection of traditional knowledge with WIPO bringing in a new internal patent classification system, where sub-groups on traditional knowledge were created for the first time. This led to the creation of India's Traditional Knowledge Digital Library, which helped in prevention of the grant of wrong patents on traditional knowledge.

He pioneered the concept of Gandhian Engineering in 2008 (Getting More from Less for More People). His paper with late C.K. Prahalad titled `Innovation’s Holy Grail’ has been considered as a significant contribution to inclusive innovation. His other contributions amplify the concept of More from Less for More.

He was on the Engineering and Computer Science jury for the Infosys Prize from 2009 to 2015.

National contributions 

He was a member of the Scientific Advisory Council to the Prime Minister and also of the Scientific Advisory Committee to the Cabinet set up by successive governments. He has chaired twelve high powered committees set up to look into diverse issues ranging from national auto fuel policy to overhauling the Indian drug regulatory system & dealing with the menace of spurious drugs. He was appointed by the Government as Assessor for the One-man Inquiry Commission investigating into the Bhopal Gas Tragedy (1985–86), and as Chairman of the Committee for investigating the Maharashtra Gas Cracker Complex accident (1990–91).

Deeply connected with the innovation movement in India, Dr. Mashelkar served as the Chairman of India's National Innovation Foundation (2000-2018). He chaired Reliance Innovation Council, KPIT Technologies Innovation Council, Persistent Systems Innovation Council and Marico Foundation's Governing Council. He co-chairs the Maharashtra State Innovation Society.

Research 

Mashelkar has made contributions in transport phenomena, particularly in thermodynamics of swelling, superswelling and shrinking polymers, modelling of polymerisation reactors, and engineering analysis of Non-Newtonian flows.

Controversy 

In 2005, the Indian government established a technical expert group on patent laws under the chairmanship of Mashelkar. Its purpose was to determine whether amendments made in Indian patent law were TRIPS compliant. The committee unanimously concluded that the amendments were not TRIPS compliant.

The report generated controversy when editorials published simultaneously in the Times of India and The Hindu alleged parts of the report had been plagiarised. Mashelkar subsequently withdrew the report due to the alleged plagiarism, admitting to flaws in the report whilst stating, "This is the first time such a thing has happened." He later also explained that the technical flaw was not the alleged lack of attribution but it was citing the attribution at the end of the report than in the body of the report due to the style adopted for the report.

The controversy was raised in the Indian Parliament, with demands that the report be "trashed" and the issues be referred to a joint standing committee. However, the government instead referred the report back to the technical expert group to reexamine and correct the inaccuracies. The report was resubmitted after corrections in March 2009 and was accepted by the Government as such.

Awards and recognition 

Dr. Mashelkar has received several awards and is a member of numerous scientific bodies and committees. So far, 45 universities from around the world have honored him with honorary doctorates, which include Universities of London, Salford, Pretoria, Wisconsin, Swinburne, Monash and Delhi.

Honours by President of India: (highest Indian civilian awards)

 Padma Shri, India's fourth highest civilian award (1991) 
 Padma Bhushan, India's third highest civilian award (2000) 
 Padma Vibhushan, India's second highest civilian award (2014)

Election to Prestigious Academies (International):

 Fellow, The World Academy of Sciences (TWAS) (1993)
 Fellow, Royal Society (FRS), London (1998)
 Foreign Associate, National Academy of Sciences, USA (2005)
 Foreign Associate, National Academy of Engineering, USA (2003)
 Foreign Member, Royal Academy of Engineering, UK (1996)
 Foreign Fellow, American Academy of Arts & Sciences (2011)
 Corresponding Member of Australian Academy of Science (2017)
 Foreign Fellow, Australian Academy of Technological Sciences and Engineering (ATSE) (2008)
 Fellow, US National Academy of Inventors (2017)
 Fellow, World Academy of Arts & Science, USA (2000)
 Fellow, International Union of Pure & Applied Chemistry (2012)
 Fellow, The Institute of Physics, London (1998)
 Fellow, Institute of Electronics and Tele-communication Engineers (IETE) (1998)
 Fellow, Institution of Chemical Engineers, UK (1996)
 Fellow, Royal Society of Chemistry, Cambridge, UK (2006)

Election to Prestigious Academies (National):

 Fellow, Indian National Science Academy (1984)
 Fellow, Indian Academy of Sciences (1983)
 Fellow, Maharashtra Academy of Sciences (1985)
 Fellow, Indian National Academy of Engineering (1987)
 Fellow, The National Academy of Sciences, India (1989)
 Fellow, Indian Institute of Chemical Engineers (1992) 
 Fellow, Indian Association for the Cultivation of Science, Kolkata (2005)

Presidency of Top Academic Bodies

 President, Indian National Science Academy (2005-2007)
 President, Institution of Chemicals Engineers, UK (2007–08)
 General President, Indian Science Congress (1999-2000)
 President, Materials Research Society of India (2004–06)
 President, Physical Sciences, National Academy of Sciences (1991)
 President, Maharashtra Academy of Sciences (1991–94)
 President, Society for Polymer Science in India (1986–92) 
 President, Indian Society of Rheology (1986–93)
 Vice-President, Materials Research Society of India (1993–95) 
 Vice-President, Indian Academy of Sciences (1995-2000)

Awards and Honours: International
He won the TWAS Lenovo Science Prize, which is the highest honour given by The World Academy of Science.
 Judge, Queen Elizabeth Prize of Engineering 2019
 The TWAS medal (2005) by The World Academy of Sciences
 World Federation of Engineering Organisations (WFEO) Medal of Engineering Excellence (2003) by WFEO, Paris
 Star of Asia Award (2005) of Business Week (USA) at the hands of George Bush (Sr), Former President of USA
 Wolff-Ramanujam Medal Lecture, French Academy of Science, Paris (2007). 
 ETH Presidential Lecture (2007), Zurich.
 Inaugural BP Innovation Oration, Judge Business School, University of Cambridge (2010).
 IIFA Ben Gurion Award, Israel (2009) for contributions in Science & Technology
 Asian Development Bank Eminent Speaker Forum Oration, Manila (2014)
 P.V. Danckwerts Memorial Lecture, IChemE, London (1994)

References 

Scientists from Goa
1943 births
Living people
Indian chemical engineers
Rheologists
University of Mumbai alumni
Institute of Chemical Technology alumni
Marathi people
Recipients of the Padma Bhushan in science & engineering
Recipients of the Padma Shri in science & engineering
Fellows of the Royal Society
Fellows of the Royal Academy of Engineering
People from North Goa district
Recipients of the Maharashtra Bhushan Award
Foreign associates of the National Academy of Sciences
Recipients of the Padma Vibhushan in science & engineering
20th-century Indian chemists
20th-century Indian engineers
Engineers from Goa
Indian fluid dynamicists
Fellows of the Australian Academy of Technological Sciences and Engineering
Foreign associates of the National Academy of Engineering
Recipients of the Shanti Swarup Bhatnagar Award in Engineering Science